Empirica Capital LLC was a hedge fund founded in 1999 by Nassim Nicholas Taleb in partnership with Mark Spitznagel, that used Taleb's black swan strategy. The firm closed in 2005 as Taleb took time off for health reasons.

The investment strategy of the fund has been explained in a New Yorker article. One of Empirica's funds, Empirica Kurtosis LLC, was reported to have made a 60% return in 2000 followed by losses in 2001, 2002, and single digit gains in 2003 and 2004.
 
Taleb has stated that he shut down Empirica LLC, in 2005 to become a "writer and a scholar. At the time he also "feared he might have a recurrence of throat cancer."

Empirica Capital is voluntarily wound up on Dec 2004 https://pbs.twimg.com/media/Fkr_bVHUYAA7GHw?format=jpg&name=large

In 2007 Spitznagel founded the firm Universa Investments L.P. with Taleb as an adviser using black swan portfolio hedging strategies similar to Empirica's.

References

Financial services companies established in 1999
Hedge fund firms of the United States
American companies established in 1999